The French Chess Championship is the annual, national chess tournament of France. It was officially first played in 1923
after the formation of the Fédération Française des Echecs in 1921. The first unofficial national tournament was played in 1880, in the Café de la Régence, where further edition were held in 1881 and 1883. The 1903 and 1914 tournaments were the first real predecessors of the official championship. They ran under the name Championnat de France des amateurs (Championship of the chess enthusiasts).

Unofficial championships
{| class="sortable wikitable"
! # !! Championship !! Year !! City !! Winner
|-
| (1) || National-ch || 1880 ||Paris||Samuel Rosenthal
|-
| (2) || National-ch || 1881  ||Paris||Edward Chamier
|-
| (3) || National-ch || 1883 ||Paris||Albert Clerc
|-
| (1) || Amateur-ch || 1903  || Arcachon || Adolphe Silbert
|-
| (2) || Amateur-ch || 1914 || Lyon || Alphonse Goetz
|-
|}

Official championships
{| class="sortable wikitable"
! # !! Year !! City !! Winner
|-
|  1 || 1923 ||Paris||Georges Renaud
|-
|  2 || 1924 || Strasbourg || Robert Crépeaux
|-
|  3 || 1925 || Nice || Robert Crépeaux
|-
|  4 || 1926 || Biarritz || André Chéron
|-
|  5 || 1927 || Chamonix || André Chéron
|-
|  6 || 1928 || Marseille || Aimé Gibaud
|-
|  7 || 1929 || Saint-Claude || André Chéron
|-
|  8 || 1930 || Rouen || Aimé Gibaud
|-
|  9 || 1931 || Lille || André Muffang
|-
| 10 || 1932 || La Baule || Maurice Raizman
|-
| 11 || 1933 || Sarreguemines || Aristide Gromer
|-
| 12 || 1934 ||Paris||Victor Kahn
|-
| 13 || 1935 || Saint-Alban-les-Eaux || Aimé Gibaud
|-
| 14 || 1936 ||Paris||Maurice Raizman
|-
| 15 || 1937 || Toulouse || Aristide Gromer
|-
| 16 || 1938 || Nice || Aristide Gromer
|-
| 17 || 1940 || Nice || Aimé Gibaud
|-
| 18 || 1941 ||Paris||Robert Crépeaux
|-
| 19 || 1942 ||Paris||Roger Daniel
|-
| 20 || 1943 || Pau || Louis Bigot
|-
| 21 || 1945 || Roubaix || César Boutteville
|-
| 22 || 1946 || Bordeaux || Maurice Raizman
|-
| 23 || 1947 || Rouen || Maurice Raizman
|-
| 24 || 1948 ||Paris||Nicolas Rossolimo
|-
| 25 || 1949 || Besançon || Claude Hugot
|-
| 26 || 1950 || Aix-en-Provence || César Boutteville
|-
| 27 || 1951 || Vichy || Maurice Raizman
|-
| 28 || 1952 || Charleville || Maurice Raizman
|-
| 29 || 1953 ||Paris||Savielly Tartakower
|-
| 30 || 1954 || Marseille || César Boutteville
|-
| 31 || 1955 || Toulouse || César Boutteville
|-
| 32 || 1956 || Vittel || Pierre Rolland
|-
| 33 || 1957 || Bordeaux || Volf Bergraser
|-
| 34 || 1958 || Le Touquet || Claude Lemoine
|-
| 35 || 1959 || Reims || César Boutteville
|-
| 36 || 1961 ||Paris||Guy Mazzoni
|-
| 37 || 1962 ||Paris||André Thiellement
|-
| 38 || 1963 ||Paris||André Thiellement
|-
| 39 || 1964 || Montpellier || Michel Roos
|-
| 40 || 1965 || Dunkerque || Guy Mazzoni
|-
| 41 || 1966 || Grenoble || Volf Bergraser
|-
| 42 || 1967 || Dieppe || César Boutteville
|-
| 43 || 1968 || Charbonnières-les-Bains || Jean-Claude Letzelter
|-
| 44 || 1969 || Pau || Jacques Planté
|-
| 45 || 1970 || Mulhouse || Jacques Maclès
|-
| 46 || 1971 || Mérignac || Jean-Claude Letzelter
|-
| 47 || 1972 || Rosny-sous-Bois || Aldo Haïk
|-
| 48 || 1973 || Vittel || Michel Benoit
|-
| 49 || 1974 || Chambéry || Jean-Claude Letzelter
|-
| 50 || 1975 || Dijon || Miodrag Todorcevic
|-
| 51 || 1976 || Saint-Jean-de-Monts|| François Chevaldonnet
|-
| 52 || 1977 || Le Touquet || Louis Roos
|-
| 53 || 1978 || Castelnaudary || Nicolas Giffard
|-
| 54 || 1979 || Courchevel || Bachar Kouatly
|-
| 55 || 1980 || Puteaux || Jean-Luc Seret
|-
| 56 || 1981 || Vitrolles || Jean-Luc Seret
|-
| 57 || 1982 || Schiltigheim || Nicolas Giffard
|-
| 58 || 1983 || Belfort || Aldo Haïk
|-
| 59 || 1984 || Alès || Jean-Luc Seret
|-
| 60 || 1985 || Clermont-Ferrand || Jean-Luc Seret
|-
| 61 || 1986 || Épinal || Gilles Mirallès
|-
| 62 || 1987 || Rouen || Christophe Bernard
|-
| 63 || 1988 || Val Thorens || Gilles Andruet
|-
| 64 || 1989 || Épinal || Gilles Mirallès
|-
| 65 || 1990 || Angers || Marc Santo-Roman
|-
| 66 || 1991 || Montpellier || Marc Santo-Roman
|-
| 67 || 1992 || Strasbourg || Manuel Apicella
|-
| 68 || 1993 || Nantes || Emmanuel Bricard
|-
| 69 || 1994 || Chambéry || Marc Santo-Roman
|-
| 70 || 1995 || Toulouse || Éric Prié
|-
| 71 || 1996 || Auxerre || Christian Bauer
|-
| 72 || 1997 || Narbonne || Anatoly Vaisser
|-
| 73 || 1998 || Méribel || Josif Dorfman
|-
| 74 || 1999 || Besançon || Étienne Bacrot
|-
| 75 || 2000 || Vichy || Étienne Bacrot
|-
| 76 || 2001 || Marseille || Étienne Bacrot
|-
| 77 || 2002 || Val-d'Isère || Étienne Bacrot
|-
| 78 || 2003 || Aix-les-Bains || Étienne Bacrot
|-
| 79 || 2004 || Val-d'Isère || Joël Lautier
|-
| 80 || 2005 || Chartres || Joël Lautier
|-
| 81 || 2006 || Besançon || Vladislav Tkachiev
|-
| 82 || 2007 || Aix-les-Bains || Maxime Vachier-Lagrave
|-
| 83 || 2008 || Pau || Étienne Bacrot
|-
| 84 || 2009 || Nîmes || Vladislav Tkachiev
|-
| 85 || 2010 || Belfort || Laurent Fressinet
|-
| 86 || 2011 || Caen || Maxime Vachier-Lagrave
|-
| 87 || 2012 || Pau || Romain Edouard, Maxime Vachier-Lagrave, Christian Bauer, Étienne Bacrot (see below)
|-
| 88 || 2013 || Nancy || Hicham Hamdouchi
|-
| 89 || 2014 || Nîmes || Laurent Fressinet
|-
| 90 || 2015 || Saint Quentin  || Christian Bauer
|-
| 91 || 2016 || Agen || Matthieu Cornette
|-
| 92 || 2017 || Agen || Étienne Bacrot
|-
| 93 || 2018 || Nîmes || Tigran Gharamian
|-
| 94 || 2019 || Chartres || Maxime Lagarde
|}

Edouard, Vachier-Lagrave, Bacrot and Bauer were tied on a score of 7/10 going into the final round. However then there was the shock news of the death of Christian Bauer's 4 month old child. The players decided to cancel the 11th and final round. Edouard, Vachier-Lagrave and Bacrot were to play off for the title, but on further reflection it was decided that all 4 players should share the title.

Women's winners

{| class="sortable wikitable"
! Year !! City !! Winner
|-
| 1924    ||Paris||Marie Jeanne Frigard
|-
| 1925    ||Paris||Paulette Schwartzmann (off contest)Marie Jeanne Frigard
|-
| 1926    ||Paris||Marie Jeanne Frigard
|-
| 1927    ||Paris||Paulette Schwartzmann (off contest)Marie Jeanne Frigard
|-
| 1928    ||Paris||Paulette Schwartzmann (off contest)Jeanne D'Autremont
|-
| 1929    ||Paris||Paulette Schwartzmann (off contest)Jeanne D'Autremont
|-
| 1931    ||Paris||Paulette Schwartzmann (off contest)Louise Pape
|-
| 1932    ||Paris||Alice Tonini (off contest)Jeanne D'Autremont
|-
| 1933    ||Paris||Alice Tonini (off contest)Paulette Schwartzmann
|-
| 1934    ||Paris||Alice Tonini (off contest)Maud Flandin
|-
| 1935    ||Paris||Paulette Schwartzmann
|-
| 1936    ||Paris||Chantal Chaudé de Silans
|-
| 1937    ||Toulouse||Angles D'Auriac
|-
| 1938    ||Nice||Paulette Schwartzmann
|-
| 1941    ||Paris||Long
|-
| 1942    ||Paris||Duval
|-
| 1943    ||Paris||Suzanne Dehelly
|}

 No contest held between 1944 and 1954

{| class="sortable wikitable"
! Year !! City !! Winner
|-
| 1955    || Toulouse || Vazeille
|-
| 1956    || Vittel || Isabelle Choko
|}

 No contest held between 1957 and 1974

{| class="sortable wikitable"
! Year !! City !! Winner
|-
| 1975    ||Paris||Milinka Merlini
|-
| 1976    || Saint-Jean-de-Monts || Milinka Merlini
|-
| 1977    || Le Touquet || Milinka Merlini
|-
| 1978    || Castelnaudary || Milinka Merlini
|-
| 1979    || Courchevel || Monique Ruck-Petit
|-
| 1980    ||Paris||Milinka Merlini
|-
| 1981    || Orange || Josiane Legendre
|-
| 1982    || Orange || Martine Dubois
|-
| 1983    || Montpellier || Julia Lebel-Arias
|-
| 1984    || Loches || Isabelle Kientzler
|-
| 1985    || Lille || Christine Leroy
|-
| 1986    || Orange || Julia Lebel-Arias
|-
| 1987    || Baud || Sabine Fruteau
|-
| 1988    || not played
|-
| 1989    || Orange || Sabine Fruteau
|-
| 1990    || Challes-les-Eaux || Julia Lebel-Arias
|-
| 1991    || Montpellier || Christine Flear (née Leroy)
|-
| 1992    || Le Havre || Claire Gervais
|-
| 1993    || Nantes || Claire Gervais
|-
| 1994    || Chambéry || Christine Flear (née Leroy)
|-
| 1995    || Toulouse  || Raphaelle Bujisho (later Raphaelle Delahaye)
|-
| 1996    || Auxerre || Claire Gervais
|-
| 1997    || Bastia || Malina Nicoara
|-
| 1998    || Meribel || Christine Flear (née Leroy)
|-
| 1999    || Besançon || Christine Flear (née Leroy)
|-
| 2000    || Vichy || Marie Sebag
|-
| 2001    || Marseille || Maria Nepeina-Leconte
|-
| 2002    || Val d'Isère || Marie Sebag
|-
| 2003    || Aix-les-Bains  || Sophie Milliet
|-
| 2004    || Val d'Isère || Almira Skripchenko
|-
| 2005    || Chartres || Almira Skripchenko
|-
| 2006    || Besançon || Almira Skripchenko
|-
| 2007    || Aix-les-Bains || Silvia Collas
|-
| 2008    || Pau || Sophie Milliet
|-
| 2009    || Nîmes || Sophie Milliet
|-
| 2010    || Belfort || Almira Skripchenko
|-
| 2011   || Caen || Sophie Milliet
|-
| 2012   || Pau || Almira Skripchenko
|-
| 2013   || Nancy || Nino Maisuradze
|-
| 2014    || Nîmes || Nino Maisuradze
|-
| 2015    || Saint Quentin  || Almira Skripchenko
|-
| 2016 || Agen || Sophie Milliet
|-
| 2017 || Agen || Sophie Milliet
|-
| 2018 || Nîmes || Pauline Guichard
|-
| 2019 || Chartres || Pauline Guichard
|}

Some crosstables

{| class="wikitable" style="text-align: center;"
|+ FRA-ch (Women) 77th Val d'Isere 2002
!   !! Player !! Rating !! 1 !! 2 !! 3 !! 4 !! 5 !! 6 !! 7 !! 8 !! 9 !! 0 !! 1 !! 2 !! Points !! TB !! Perf. !! +/-
|-
| 1 || align=left|             ||2344  ||* ||½ ||½ ||1 ||½ ||1 ||½ ||1 ||1 ||1 ||1 ||1 ||9   ||      || 2417 || +9
|-
| 2 || align=left|         ||2176  ||½ ||* ||1 ||0 ||1 ||0 ||½ ||1 ||½ ||1 ||1 ||1 ||7½  ||35.50 || 2304 || +19
|-
| 3 || align=left|      ||2166  ||½ ||0 ||* ||½ ||1 ||½ ||1 ||0 ||1 ||1 ||1 ||1 ||7½  ||34.75 || 2305 || +21
|-
| 4 || align=left|          ||2301  ||0 ||1 ||½ ||* ||½ ||0 ||1 ||1 ||½ ||1 ||1 ||1 ||7½  ||33.75 || 2293 || 0
|-
| 5 || align=left|          ||2173  ||½ ||0 ||0 ||½ ||* ||1 ||½ ||1 ||1 ||1 ||1 ||1 ||7½  ||32.50 || 2304 || +20
|-
| 6 || align=left|             ||2169  ||0 ||1 ||½ ||1 ||0 ||* ||0 ||0 ||½ ||1 ||1 ||1 ||6   ||      || 2204 || +5
|-
| 7 || align=left|||2170  ||½ ||½ ||0 ||0 ||½ ||1 ||* ||½ ||½ ||½ ||1 ||½ ||5½  ||      || 2172 || 0
|-
| 8 || align=left|      ||2238  ||0 ||0 ||1 ||0 ||0 ||1 ||½ ||* ||0 ||1 ||½ ||1 ||5   ||      || 2135 || -16
|-
| 9 || align=left|       ||2081  ||0 ||½ ||0 ||½ ||0 ||½ ||½ ||1 ||* ||½ ||½ ||½ ||4½  ||      || 2116 || +5
|-
| 10 || align=left|         ||2049  ||0 ||0 ||0 ||0 ||0 ||0 ||½ ||0 ||½ ||* ||1 ||1 ||3   ||      || 2014 || -6
|-
| 11 || align=left|        ||2123  ||0 ||0 ||0 ||0 ||0 ||0 ||0 ||½ ||½ ||0 ||* ||1 ||2   ||      || 1916 || -27
|-
| 12 || align=left|          ||2077  ||½ ||0 ||0 ||0 ||0 ||0 ||½ ||0 ||½ ||0 ||0 ||* ||1   ||      || 1781 || -30
|}

{| class="wikitable" style="text-align: center;"
|+  FRA-ch (Women) 85th Belfort 2010
!   !! Player !! Rating !! 1 !! 2 !! 3 !! 4 !! 5 !! 6 !! Points !! TB !! Perf. !! +/-
|-
| 1 || align=left|       ||2458  ||** ||½½||½1 ||1½ ||½1 ||½1 || 7½ ||      || 2498 || +5
|-
| 2 || align=left|      ||2367  ||½½ ||**||10 ||00 ||1½ ||11 || 6 ||      || 2396 || +4
|-
| 3 || align=left|   ||2337  ||½0 ||01||** ||½1 ||10 ||½½ || 5½ ||      || 2366 || +4
|-
| 4 || align=left|     ||2333  ||0½ ||11||½0 ||** ||½0 ||½½ || 5 ||      || 2333 || 0
|-
| 5 || align=left|||2320  ||½0 ||0½||01 ||½1 ||** ||½½ || 4 ||      || 2265 || -8
|-
| 6 || align=left|        ||2181  ||½0 ||00||½½ ||½½ ||½½ ||** || 2 ||      || 2123 || -6
|}

Average Elo: 2332 <=> Cat: 4

{| class="wikitable" style="text-align: center;"
|+  FRA-ch (Women) 86th Caen 2011
!   !! Player !! Rating !! 1 !! 2 !! 3 !! 4 !! 5 !! 6 !! Points !! TB !! Perf. !! +/-
|-
| 1 || align=left|       ||2355  ||** ||½½||½1 ||1½ ||½1 ||½1 || 7 ||      || 2445 || +12
|-
| 2 || align=left|      ||2329  ||½½ ||**||10 ||00 ||1½ ||11 || 5½ ||      || 2338 || +1
|-
| 3 || align=left|   ||2207  ||½0 ||01||** ||½1 ||10 ||½½ || 5 ||      || 2327 || +17
|-
| 4 || align=left|     ||2305  ||0½ ||11||½0 ||** ||½0 ||½½ || 4½ ||22.75      || 2274 || -4
|-
| 5 || align=left|||2327  ||½0 ||0½||01 ||½1 ||** ||½½ || 4½ ||21.50      || 2269 || -8
|-
| 6 || align=left|        ||2323  ||½0 ||00||½½ ||½½ ||½½ ||** || 3½ ||      || 2198 || -18
|}

Average Elo: 2307 <=> Cat: 3

References

External links
Heritage des Echecs Francais
Championnats de France
 Larousse du jeu d'Échecs (1997)

Chess national championships
Women's chess national championships
Chess in France
1923 in chess